Glyphopsyche is a genus of northern caddisflies in the family Limnephilidae. There are at least three described species in Glyphopsyche.

Species
These three species belong to the genus Glyphopsyche:
 Glyphopsyche irrorata (Fabricius, 1781)
 Glyphopsyche missouri Ross, 1944
 Glyphopsyche sequatchie Etnier & Hix, 1999

References

Further reading

External links

 

Trichoptera genera
Articles created by Qbugbot
Integripalpia